is a Japanese actress and voice actress affiliated with Nylon100.

Filmography

Anime

Film

Video games

Dubbing

Live-action
Chappie, Yolandi (Yolandi Visser)
Cinderella, Drisella (Sophie McShera)
Dark Places, Patty Day (Christina Hendricks)
Fantastic Beasts: The Secrets of Dumbledore, Bunty Broadacre (Victoria Yeates)
Meet the Blacks, Allie (Bresha Webb)
Mother's Day, Dana Barton (Jennifer Garner)
Tom & Jerry, Dorothy (Patsy Ferran)
A Walk in the Woods, Mary Ellen (Kristen Schaal)

Animation
Onward, Grecklin
Robinson Crusoe, May
Avatar: The Last Airbender, Azula

Live action

References

External links
 Official agency profile 
 Official theatrical company profile 
 Mayumi Shintani at GamePlaza-Haruka Voice Acting Database 
 
 

1975 births
Living people
Former Stardust Promotion artists
Japanese musical theatre actresses
Japanese video game actresses
Japanese voice actresses
Voice actresses from Hiroshima Prefecture
20th-century Japanese actresses
21st-century Japanese actresses